Martim Afonso Chichorro II or Martin Alfonso de Sousa (1280-?) was a Portuguese nobleman, who served in the Court of Denis of Portugal (his carnal uncle).

Biography 

Born in Portugal, he was the son of Martim Afonso Chichorro and Inês Lourenço de Valadares. His paternal grandfather was Afonso III of Portugal. He was married to Aldonça Anes de Briteiros, daughter of João Rodrigues de Briteiros and Guiomar Gil de Soverosa, a family belonging to the Portuguese nobility.

References 

1280s births
1300s deaths
13th-century Portuguese people
14th-century Portuguese people
Portuguese nobility
Portuguese Roman Catholics